This is a list of European colonial administrators responsible for the territory of Portuguese Guinea, an area equivalent to modern-day Guinea-Bissau. In 1941 the capital moved from Bolama to Bissau.

List

(Dates in italics indicate de facto continuation of office)

For continuation after independence, see: List of presidents of Guinea-Bissau

See also
 Guinea-Bissau
 Politics of Guinea-Bissau
 List of presidents of Guinea-Bissau
 List of prime ministers of Guinea-Bissau
 List of captains-major of Bissau
 List of captains-major of Cacheu
 Lists of office-holders

External links
 World Statesmen – Guinea-Bissau

Political history of Portugal
History of Guinea-Bissau
List
Guinea
Guinea-Bissau-related lists